Walter Krause may refer to:

 Walter Krause (footballer, born 1896), German international footballer
 Walter Krause (footballer, born 1953), German Bundesliga player